Franjo Tepurić (born 10 February 1990, in Jajce) is a Croatian football striker, currently playing for Bergsøy IL in the Norwegian Third Division.

References

External links
 

1990 births
Living people
People from Jajce
Croats of Bosnia and Herzegovina
Association football forwards
Croatian footballers
Croatia youth international footballers
Croatia under-21 international footballers
NK Slaven Belupo players
NK Koprivnica players
NK Istra 1961 players
NK Croatia Sesvete players
NK Sesvete players
HNK Šibenik players
IL Hødd players
Croatian Football League players
First Football League (Croatia) players
Norwegian First Division players
Norwegian Third Division players
Norwegian Fourth Division players
Croatian expatriate footballers
Expatriate footballers in Norway
Croatian expatriate sportspeople in Norway